Ngau Tau Kok is a station on the Hong Kong MTR Kwun Tong line. It is located in the Ngau Tau Kok area of Kowloon East, between Kwun Tong and Kowloon Bay stations. It was among the earliest stations in the network, being opened on 1 October 1979.

The majority of passengers use Ngau Tau Kok station to commute.

Due to difficulties in installing platform screen doors (PSDs) in above ground stations, the MTR decided not to install PSDs in this station, instead installing automatic platform gates (APGs) on the station's platforms in 2011.

History 
Ngau Tau Kok station opened when the Modified Initial System opened on 1 October 1979.

Station layout 
Platforms 1 and 2 share the same island platform, and the east parts are curved, so the gap between platform and train is large.

Gallery

Entrances/exits 

A: Millennium City
B1: Lotus Tower
B2: Garden Estate
B3: Ngau Tau Kok Road
B4: Kwun Tong Road
B5: How Ming Street
B6: Lai Yip Street

References 

MTR stations in Kowloon
Kwun Tong line
Ngau Tau Kok
Railway stations in Hong Kong opened in 1979